The men's 62 kg event at the 2013 Southeast Asian Games took place on 13 December 2013 at Thein Phyu Stadium.

Schedule
All times are Myanmar Standard Time (UTC+06:30)

Results

New records
The following records were established during the competition.

References

External links

Weightlifting at the 2013 Southeast Asian Games